The Tomorrow Children is an adventure video game developed by Q-Games and published by Sony Interactive Entertainment. The game was released as an early access title on September 6, 2016 as The Tomorrow Children: Founder's Pack, and was fully released on October 25, 2016, but was shut down by Sony in 2017. Q-Games later purchased the IP and released the game on September 6, 2022 as The Tomorrow Children: Phoenix Edition.

Development
The Tomorrow Children was announced during Gamescom 2014 at Sony's press conference in August 2014.

Engadget has described the game as "a mix of Minecraft-esque collaborative building, social economics and a Soviet Union-themed post-apocalyptic dystopia." The Tomorrow Children runs on a proprietary game engine developed by Q-Games. The game's graphics engine utilizes new technology, aiming to achieve a Pixar-like pre-rendered CGI look with real-time 3D graphics. It utilizes the PlayStation 4's Async Compute technology extensively. It features new lighting techniques developed by Q-Games, such as cascaded voxel cone ray tracing, which simulates lighting in real-time and uses more realistic reflections rather than screen space reflections. This allows real-time global illumination, without any need for pre-calculated or pre-baked lighting. It supports direct and indirect illumination in real-time, and up to three bounces of light per pixel from all directions (compared to one bounce for Pixar films). It also features deformable landscapes, with layered depth cubes, representing the world as volumes, which are then converted to polygons as needed.

A public beta test occurred from June 3–6, 2016.

Audio 
Voice casting and dialogue work was completed by Glen Gathard and team at Shepperton studios.

Discontinuation and relaunch 
On July 6, 2017, six months after its launch, it was announced the game would cease operations on November 1, 2017. The game was discontinued due to the inability to properly monetise the game, in addition to the cost of running the servers. In the years following its shutdown, Cuthbert noticed that players were continuing to share screenshots and videos from the game.

On November 9, 2021, Q-Games announced that they had acquired the IP to The Tomorrow Children from Sony Interactive Entertainment and intended to "rebuild" and relaunch the game at a later date. This was an unprecedented move, as SIE had previously expressed disapproval towards the idea of selling their IPs.

The game was re-released in 2022 as The Tomorrow Children: Phoenix Edition. Its dependence on a central server and microtransactions were removed in order to ensure it would remain playable offline. The new release is no longer free-to-play.

Reception 
The Tomorrow Children received mixed or average reviews, according to review aggregator Metacritic.

Since its discontinuation, The Tomorrow Children has been recognised as being ahead of its time due to its art style, graphics and lighting.

Notes

References

External links
 Official website
 Archived Website

2016 video games
Alternate history video games
Free-to-play video games
Multiplayer and single-player video games
PlayStation 4 games
PlayStation 4-only games
PlayStation Network games
Sony Interactive Entertainment games
Video games developed in Japan
Video games scored by Joel Corelitz
Q-Games games